Calton may refer to:

Places:
Calton, Argyll and Bute, a location in Scotland
Calton, Glasgow, Scotland
Calton (ward), an electoral ward of the Glasgow City Council
Calton, North Yorkshire, England
Calton, Ontario, Canada
Calton, Staffordshire, England
Calton Hill, Edinburgh, Scotland

People:
Patsy Calton, British politician